John "Jack" Conway (3 February 1842 – 22 August 1909) was an Australian cricketer who played first-class cricket from 1861–62 to 1879–80. He organised the first Test match in March 1877, and Australia's first cricket tour in 1878. He was also an accomplished Australian rules footballer who captained the Carlton Football Club between 1866 and 1871.

Career
A right-handed batsman and a right-arm fast round-arm bowler, Conway played for Victoria and made ten appearances in first-class matches between 1862 and 1875. He played a single match for Otago in New Zealand in 1880.

Conway is best remembered for his work as an organiser and promoter of international cricket. He acted as the Australian agent for the English team that toured Australia in 1876–77, and towards the end of the tour he arranged for the leading players from New South Wales and Victoria to play a "Grand Combination Match" against the English team at the Melbourne Cricket Ground. This match is now regarded as the first Test match. 

The success of this match and another hastily arranged match shortly afterwards led Conway and several of the Australian team to contemplate the feasibility of a tour of England. Despite the objections of the state cricket associations, Conway organised and managed the inaugural Australian tour of England in 1878. The tour began in November 1877 with matches in Australia and New Zealand before the main tour of England, and continued with a tour of North America and some final matches in Australia, concluding in January 1879. The tour, undertaken for profit, yielded about 1000 pounds for each of the eleven players, and 1200 pounds for Conway. 

For many years, Conway worked as a journalist covering football, cricket, horse racing and coursing. He also acted as agent for English cricket teams that visited Australia in 1881–82 and 1884–85.

Personal life
Conway and his wife Elizabeth had seven children, but only their son Leslie married. Conway's relatives included the cricketer Sydney Donahoo, a nephew, and the writer Ronald Conway, a grandson.

Conway died at his home in Frankston, Victoria in August 1909, aged 67. Attendees at a small private funeral included Tom Horan and Frank Allan from the 1878 team.

References

External links

 John Conway: "and one man in his time plays many parts…"

Further reading
 Arthur Haygarth, Scores & Biographies, Volumes 1–11 (1744–1870), Lillywhite, 1862–72

1842 births
1909 deaths
Australian cricketers
Victoria cricketers
Otago cricketers
Australian rules footballers from Victoria (Australia)
Cricketers from Victoria (Australia)
Melbourne Cricket Club cricketers
Carlton Football Club (VFA) players
Melbourne Football Club (pre-VFA) players